Team Kaobon, which was formerly known as Fighters and Fitness is a mixed martial arts team from Liverpool, England. "Team Kaobon" is well known for being the training camp of multiple English lightweight fighters based in the Ultimate Fighting Championships - the top MMA organization - as well as domestically.



Background

Team Kaobon, one of a few MMA gyms based in Liverpool, England (such as the MMA Academy and Next Generation MMA), and was formerly known as "Fighters and Fitness". It has been home to many MMA fighters who have competed domestically in promotions like BAMMA, as well as abroad in the Ultimate Fighting Championship. The gym has undergone changes in recent years, to which founder, Colin Heron, attributed to the growth of the sport of Mixed Martial Arts.

Notable fighters
The following notable fighters have been associated with Team Kaobon
Terry Etim - UFC
Paul Kelly - UFC veteran
Paul Sass - UFC fighter and holder of 7 consecutive triangle choke victories
Paul Taylor - UFC veteran
Darren Till - UFC Middleweight
Tom Aspinall - UFC Heavyweight
Mike Grundy - Former UFC Featherweight

See also
List of Top Professional MMA Training Camps

References

Mixed martial arts training facilities
Sports organisations based in Liverpool
2002 establishments in England
Mixed martial arts in the United Kingdom